Kroštule is a traditional pastry from Dalmatia and Istria. It is made by deep frying dough.

See also
 Angel wings
 List of doughnut varieties 
 List of pastries

References

External links

Croatian pastries
Doughnuts